is a district located in Yamaguchi Prefecture, Japan.

As of 2003, the district has an estimated population of 42,778 and a density of 282.12 persons per km2. The total area is 151.63 km2.

Towns and villages
Hirao
Kaminoseki
Tabuse

Mergers
On April 21, 2003, the town of Kumage merged with the town of Kano, from Tsuno District, and the cities of Tokuyama and Shinnan'yō, to form the city of Shūnan.
On October 4, 2004, the town of Yamato was merged into the city of Hikari.

Districts in Yamaguchi Prefecture
Hikari, Yamaguchi